Pitcairnia brachysperma is a flowering plant in the Bromeliaceae family. It is native to Ecuador.

References

brachysperma
Flora of Ecuador
Taxa named by Édouard André